Star Trek: First Contact is a 1988 video game published by Simon & Schuster Interactive. The games was published for the Apple II and for MS DOS.

Gameplay
Star Trek: First Contact is a game in which Captain James T. Kirk and the Enterprise must contact aliens who are sending out a pulse signal before the Klingons reach the aliens.

Reception
Scorpia reviewed the game for Computer Gaming World, and stated that "Primarily for beginning to average players, since advanced players will get through this one in an afternoon."

References

1988 video games
Adventure games
Apple II games
DOS games
Simon & Schuster Interactive games
Video games based on Star Trek: The Original Series
Video games developed in the United States